Mayres may refer to the following places in France:

 Mayres, Ardèche, commune in the department of Ardèche
 Mayres, Puy-de-Dôme, commune in the department of Puy-de-Dôme
 Mayres-Savel, commune in the department of Isère